Phyllanthus polyspermus is a bush species first described Jean Louis Marie Poiret, with its current name after Schumacher and Thonning; it is included in the family Phyllanthaceae.  No subspecies are listed in the Catalogue of Life.

Note: this species is frequently misidentified as P. reticulatus (which occurs in Asia and was introduced to Jamaica).

References 

 
 

polyspermus
Flora of Africa
Plants described in 1827